Jose David Lina Jr., KGCR (born December 22, 1951), better known as Joey Lina, is a Filipino lawyer, businessman, public servant, radio personality, and politician who is the former governor of Laguna and former Senator of the Philippines.

Political career
After Marcos was ousted, Lina was appointed as acting Governor of Metro Manila, serving from 1986 to 1987.

During the canvassing of votes in the 1992 election, Lina was present with Ilocos Norte Rep. Roque Ablan Jr. as representatives of presidential candidate Imelda Marcos.

From 1995 to 2001, he served as  Governor of Laguna, and from 2001 to 2004, he was then appointed as Secretary of the Interior and Local Government.

He is the current president of Manila Hotel.

References

External links
Joey Lina's website

1951 births
Living people
Arroyo administration cabinet members
Governors of Laguna (province)
Governors of Metro Manila
Laban ng Demokratikong Pilipino politicians
Liberal Party (Philippines) politicians
PDP–Laban politicians
People from Laguna (province)
Secretaries of the Interior and Local Government of the Philippines
Senators of the 8th Congress of the Philippines
Senators of the 9th Congress of the Philippines
University of Santo Tomas alumni